Redcross (formerly Baile Domhnaill Rua) is a village and also a civil parish in County Wicklow, Ireland.

Townlands
The civil parish of Redcross comprises the following twenty-nine townlands:
Ballintim, Ballinvally Lower, Ballinvally Upper, Ballycapple, Ballydonnell, Ballygillaroe, Ballykean (Annesley), Ballykean (Penrose), Ballykean (Stringer), Ballynamona, Ballyrogan Lower, Ballyrogan Upper, Blindwood, Chapel, Coolanearl, Crone Lower, Crone Upper, Kilmacrea Lower, Kilmacrea Upper, Kilmacoo, Kilmurry North, Kilmurry South, Oghil Lower, Oghil Upper, Rahaval, Redcross, Springfarm, Templelyon Lower, and Templelyon Upper.

Village
Redcross is a small village set amongst a number of low hills. The R754 passes through the village and there is a post office, two shops and a public house, as well as two caravan parks. Amenities include a golf course, a sports hall, tennis courts, a bowling ground and a wine bar. The church, a small building without a tower or spire, was built in 1829, when the parishes of Kilbride, Dunganstown and Castlemacadam were united.

Notable visitors
The philosopher Ludwig Wittgenstein stayed at a farmhouse in Redcross in 1948. Durganstown is the ancestral home of President John F. Kennedy.

The village Redcross has been used for the setting of a number of films, one of these being Durango, based on a book by John B. Keane.

See also 
 List of towns and villages in Ireland

References

Towns and villages in County Wicklow